Niamh McEvoy (born 2 October 1990) is a senior Dublin ladies' footballer and an Australian rules footballer with Melbourne Football Club in the AFL Women's. McEvoy was a member of the Dublin teams that won the All-Ireland Senior Ladies' Football Championship in 2010, 2017, 2018 and 2019. She was also a member of the Dublin team that won the 2018 Ladies' National Football League.

Early life and education
McEvoy is from Malahide. She recalls attending the 2003 All-Ireland Senior Ladies' Football Championship Final when she was 12 with her father, Dave. She attended Malahide Community School where she played ladies' Gaelic football and captained the basketball team. Between 2009 and 2012 she attended Trinity College Dublin where she qualified as a primary school teacher. Between 2018 and 2019 she completed a MSc in Business and Entrepreneurship at Dublin Institute of Technology.

Gaelic football

Clubs
At club level, McEvoy has played for St Sylvester's and DIT.

Inter-county
Together with Noëlle Healy, Sinéad Goldrick and Hannah Tyrrell, McEvoy was part of a generation of Dublin ladies' footballers who won All-Ireland titles at under-14, under-16 and under-18 levels before playing for the senior team. McEvoy was a member of the Dublin team that won the 2010 All-Ireland Senior Ladies' Football Championship Final. She was one of two players named Niamh McEvoy who played for Dublin in the 2010 final. She came on as a second-half substitute, replacing the player sharing her name, Niamh McEvoy of Parnells. McEvoy established herself as a  regular in the Dublin team during the 2010s, finishing as an All-Ireland runner-up in 2014, 2015 and 2016. She was subsequently a member of the Dublin teams that won the 2017,  2018 and 2019 All-Ireland finals. She was a member of the Dublin team that won the 2018 Ladies' National Football League. In 2019 McEvoy won her first All Star award.

Australian rules football

In October 2019, McEvoy and her Dublin teammate Sinéad Goldrick signed to play for the Melbourne Football Club in the AFL Women's (AFLW) in 2020. In April 2021, McEvoy announced her retirement from Australian rules football.

Personal life
Between 2012 and 2018, McEvoy worked as a primary school teacher at schools such as Holywell Educate Together National School in Swords, Dublin. McEvoy is in a relationship with Dublin county footballer Dean Rock.

Honours
Dublin
 All-Ireland Senior Ladies' Football Championship
 Winners: 2010, 2017, 2018, 2019: 4
 Runner up: 2014, 2015, 2016: 3
 Ladies' National Football League
 2018: 1
 All-Ireland Under-18 Ladies' Football Championship
 Winners: 2008
 All-Ireland Under-16 Ladies' Football Championship
 Winners: 2006
 All-Ireland Under-14 Ladies' Football Championship
 Winners: 2004
Individual
All Stars
Winner: 2019: 1

References

External links
 
 

1990 births
Living people
Dublin inter-county ladies' footballers
St Sylvester's Gaelic footballers
Winners of four All-Ireland medals (ladies' football)
Irish female players of Australian rules football
Melbourne Football Club (AFLW) players
Ladies' Gaelic footballers who switched code
Irish schoolteachers
Alumni of Trinity College Dublin
Alumni of Dublin Institute of Technology
People from Malahide
Sportspeople from Fingal
Irish expatriate sportspeople in Australia
Irish women's basketball players
Gaelic footballers' wives and girlfriends